The Battle of Singoli (1326 CE) was fought between the forces of Mewar, led by Hammir Singh, and the Tughlaq forces, led by Mohammad bin Tughlaq, at Singoli, in present-day Madhya Pradesh, India, in which Hammir Singh defeated Tughlaq forces and took Muhammad bin Tughluq as a prisoner.

Hammir Singh had gained control of Mewar by evicting Maldev's son Jaiza, the Chauhan vassal of the Delhi Sultanate. Jaiza fled to the Delhi court of Muhammad bin Tughluq, prompting Tughlaq himself to march towards Mewar with his strong army. In the ensuing battle, the Tughlaq army was defeated and Muhammad bin Tughlaq was taken prisoner. He was kept prisoner in Chittorgarh for three months and released after the Sultanate ceded Ajmer, Ranthambor, Nagaur and Sopor; and paid 50 lakhs rupees and 100 elephants as ransom to Hammir Singh.

Aftermath
Hammir Singh took control of Ajmer, Ranthambore, Nagaur, and Sopor, and also his authority was recognized by other Rajput chiefs.

References

History of Rajasthan
Mewar dynasty
Singoli
Singoli
Singoli